Radljevo is a village in Serbia. It is situated in the Ub municipality, in the Kolubara District of Central Serbia. The village has a population of 611 inhabitants, as of 2011 census.

Historical population

1948: 1165
1953: 1172
1961: 1136
1971: 948
1981: 774
1991: 677
2002: 607

References

See also
List of places in Serbia

Populated places in Serbia